In mathematics, the term minimal prime may refer to 
Minimal prime ideal, in commutative algebra
Minimal prime (recreational mathematics), the minimal prime number satisfying some property